Shraga Moshe Kalmanowitz (May 15, 1918 – April 16, 1998) was a Polish-American Orthodox rabbi. He was a rosh yeshiva (dean) of the Mir Yeshiva in Brooklyn, New York , from 1964 to 1998.

Biography
Kalmanowitz was born in Rakov, Poland, to Avraham Kalmanowitz, the rabbi of the town, and Rochel Cohen, the daughter of Betzalel Hakohen, a dayan (rabbinical court judge) in Vilna. He had the brothers and two sisters.

At the age of 10, Kalmanowitz began studying at the Mir yeshiva in Mir, Belarus, and later studied at the Kaminetz Yeshiva led by Baruch Ber Leibowitz. He came to the United States with his mother and siblings in 1941 (his father had immigrated a year earlier) and studied at both Yeshiva Torah Vodaas and Beth Medrash Elyon.

After his marriage, Kalmanowitz became a maggid shiur in the Mir Yeshiva in Brooklyn. Upon the death of his father in 1964, he and his brother-in-law, Shmuel Berenbaum, assumed the roles of roshei yeshiva. He followed his father's lead in overseeing the education of Sephardi North African students at the Mir Yeshiva. He was also close with Sephardi organizations in New York City; he was one of the speakers at the grand opening of the mikveh of the Sephardi Brooklyn community on Avenue S.

Kalmanowitz died on April 16, 1998 (20 Nisan 5758) in New York. He was buried beside his father's grave in the Sanhedria Cemetery in Jerusalem. His wife Malka Kalmanowitz died in 2020.

References

Notes

Sources

1918 births
1998 deaths
20th-century American rabbis
American Haredi rabbis
Mir rosh yeshivas
Orthodox rabbis from New York City
People from Brooklyn
Polish emigrants to the United States